Virgibacillus kekensis is a Gram-positive, moderately halophilic, endospore-forming, strictly aerobic and motile bacterium from the genus of Virgibacillus which has been isolated from saline mud from a salt lake in China.

References

Bacillaceae
Bacteria described in 2008